The Erie City School District is the school district that serves Erie, Pennsylvania in the United States. It is a member of the Northwest Tri-County IU 5.

Serving the Erie School District are two high schools, three middle schools, and ten elementary schools. On April 19, 2007, GE Transportation presented the district with a $15 million donation, which was reportedly the largest ever donation to education in Pennsylvania. In 2014 Erie school district teacher salaries were published and determined to be up to 40 percent higher than the average household in Erie pa.

As of August, 2017, student enrollment for the district's 15 schools was 11,265.

Schools

High schools (grades 9-12)
 Erie High School
 Northwest Pennsylvania Collegiate Academy

Middle schools (grades 6-8)

 East Middle School
 Strong Vincent Middle School
 Woodrow Wilson Middle School

Elementary schools (grades preK-5)
 Diehl Elementary School
 Edison Elementary School
 Grover Cleveland Elementary School
 Harding Elementary School
 Jefferson Elementary School
 Joanna Connell Elementary School
 Lincoln Elementary School
 Mckinley Elementary School
 Perry Elementary School
 Pfeiffer-Burleigh Elementary School

Former schools
Beginning with the 2012/13 school year, the district closed three schools, Burton, Glenwood and Irving elementary schools, due to a budget deficit and declining enrollment.  Further closings and changes are expected to happen after the 2012/13 school year, although no official timeline has been announced.

 Burton Elementary School
 Central Tech High School
 East High School
 Emerson Gridley Elementary School
 Glenwood Elementary School
 Irving Elementary School
 Wayne Middle School
 Roosevelt Middle School. Opened in 1922, and was most recently renovated in 1975. It closed in 2007 due to declining enrollment and its dilapidated condition. Because the district determined that renovating Roosevelt would cost about $30 million, the building was finally demolished in October 2020.
 Strong Vincent

In 2017, Strong Vincent and East High Schools became middle schools when these former high schools consolidated with Central Tech High School to become Erie High School.

References

External links
Erie City School District official website
East Middle School
Erie High School
Northwest Pennsylvania Collegiate Academy
Strong Vincent Middle School

Education in Erie, Pennsylvania
School districts in Erie County, Pennsylvania
School districts established in 1870
1870 establishments in Pennsylvania